U7 or U-7 may refer to:

Arts, entertainment, and media
 Ultima VII, a computer game taking place in Brittania

Science and technology
 U7 small nuclear RNA, an RNA molecule
 Haplogroup U7, a human mitochondrial DNA haplogroup

Transportation

Transport lines
 U7 (Berlin U-Bahn), a subway line in Berlin, Germany
 U7, the IATA call sign for Uganda Airlines, the national airline of Uganda

Vehicles
 Aiways U7 Ion, a Chinese electric concept minivan
 German submarine U-7, one of several German submarines
 Luxgen U7, a Taiwanese mid-size SUV

See also
7U (disambiguation)